Phil Hansen (born 1979) is a self-taught American artist.

Biography
During high school, Hansen's obsession with pointillism resulted in permanent nerve damage. Out of frustration, Hansen left art and art school, but, after speaking to his neurologist, decided to explore other forms of art, both two- and three-dimensional.
Hansen dropped out of college after two terms, and his only formal art education is from high school.

Career
Hansen's breakthrough piece was a time-lapse video of a two-day project called Influence. He painted thirty pictures on his torso, one over the other, each picture representing an influence in his life. After it was completed, he peeled the layer off and cut a silhouette of his own profile. The uploaded video was streamed over a million times on the Internet, with process and final piece clearly revealed.

Grammy Awards
Hansen was chosen to be the official Artist for 51st annual Grammy Awards held on February 8, 2009 8 pm ET.

References

External links
 
 Phil Hansen's Myspace user page
 

1979 births
Living people
21st-century American artists
Artists from Minneapolis